Soft & Quiet is a 2022 American horror thriller film written, produced and directed by Beth de Araújo in her directorial debut. It stars Stefanie Estes and Olivia Luccardi. Jason Blum serves as an executive producer under his Blumhouse Productions banner.

The film premiered in the narrative competition at South by Southwest Film Festival on March 12, 2022. It was released on November 4, 2022, by Momentum Pictures.

Plot
Kindergarten teacher Emily organizes the first-time meeting of the "Daughters for Aryan Unity", an organization of white supremacist Caucasian women, which includes ex-convict Leslie, small grocer owner Kim, and disgruntled retail worker Marjorie. The members present have various grievances against immigrants, minorities, Jews, feminists, inclusion policies such as diversity quotas, and social justice organizations such as Black Lives Matter. The meeting, held in a church, is cut short when the church pastor, uncomfortable with the topic of the group, threatens Emily into leaving. To save face, Emily decides to invite the others to her home; Leslie, Kim, and Marjorie accept.

The four travel to Kim's store for food and drink. While Emily is selecting wine, Asian-American sisters Anne and Lily arrive. Unaware that the shop was closed, they attempt to purchase wine, but are refused service by Kim. Lily becomes belligerent with Kim and Leslie while Anne attempts to defuse the situation, only to be intimidated by Emily into purchasing the most expensive item available. As the two sisters leave, Marjorie initiates a verbal confrontation with Anne which degenerates into violence. Kim arms herself with a pistol and forces the sisters out at gunpoint; while leaving Lily taunts Emily about her brother, who is currently in a county correctional facility serving time for rape.

Emily's husband Craig arrives and attempts to defuse the situation, but Leslie, who is incensed, suggests going to Anne's home to vandalize the property and steal her passport. Craig initially refuses, but is browbeaten by Emily into going along. The four women along with Craig arrive at Anne's home and perform acts of petty vandalism before Kim finds Anne's passport. Before they can leave, Anne and Lily suddenly arrive home and discover the intruders. Confused and unsure of what to do, the home invaders bind and gag Anne and Lily at gunpoint and discuss their options. Unable to condone the situation, Craig leaves.

Leslie suggests cleaning up the property to remove physical evidence of their presence and intimidating the sisters to keep them quiet. While drinking, Leslie and Marjorie beat Anne and Lily and force-feed Lily various food and drink. Lily begins choking; the women remove Anne's gag and she explains that Lily has a peanut allergy. Leslie finds an epi-pen too late and Lily dies from the allergic reaction. The group begins infighting due to this development; Kim and Marjorie want to leave immediately while Emily insists they need to remove the physical evidence. Leslie suggests making it look like a rape to make it seem less likely a group of women committed the attack, and then penetrates Anne with a carrot while the other three women clean up the crime scene. Leslie then suffocates Anne with a pillow.

The four intruders dump all of their trash, cleaning materials, and Lily and Anne's bodies into a bag and leave the property. Arriving at a nearby lake, they head out on a boat and dump the bag overboard. After they leave, Anne, still alive, frees herself.

Cast
 Stefanie Estes as Emily
 Olivia Luccardi as Leslie 
 Dana Millican as Kim
 Melissa Paulo as Anne
 Eleanore Pienta as Marjorie
 Cissy Ly as Lily
 Jon Beavers as Craig
 Jayden Leavitt as Brian
 Shannon Mahoney as Jessica
 Rebekah Wiggins as Alice
 Josh Peters
 Nina E. Jordan as Nora
 Jovita Molina as Maria
 Brooklyn Granstra as Jaime

Production
The writing of the film was inspired by the Central Park birdwatching incident; de Araújo has said that "the manipulation made me so angry". The film was shot in one continuous take over the course of four separate days with action starting at 6:34 p.m. as they wanted the outdoor discussion by the white women of what would happen to the two sisters to be at last light. The bulk of the film on screen comes from the fourth day of shooting.

Reception 
On review aggregator website Rotten Tomatoes, the film holds an approval rating of 86% based on 50 reviews, with an average rating of 7.7/10. The website's consensus reads, "A painfully timely horror-fueled thriller, Soft & Quiet forces the viewer to confront the ugly underbelly of modern American race relations." On Metacritic, the film holds a rating of 82 out of 100, based on 13 critics, indicating "universal acclaim".

References

External links 
 

2022 films
One-shot films
American horror thriller films
American thriller films
Films produced by Jason Blum
Blumhouse Productions films
Films about racism in the United States
2022 directorial debut films